The following is a history of UK Internet service providers (ISPs) in order of the date they started trading.

United Kingdom ISPs by age
 1985-6 GreenNet
 1990 Pipex
 1992-06-01 Demon Internet
 1992 ExNet Initially as 'HelpEx' service
 1993 Pavilion (Sold to Easynet from 1 January 2001, but e-mail addresses remain extant under the pavilion.net domain)
 1994-10-13 Zetnet
 1994 Easynet
 1994 U-NET
 1995 Mailbox Internet
 1995 Netdirect (NDO, now part of Namesco)
 1995 Internet Central
 1995 Flexnet
 1995 Power Internet Ltd (Powernet), now part of the Timico Technology Group
 1995 Unipalm-Pipex
 1995 Zen Internet
 1996 Lumison
 1996 Simwood
 1996 Claranet
 1996-11 Entanet
 1997 Force 9
 1998 Elite Limited
 1998 Freeserve

See also 

Internet in the United Kingdom
List of broadband providers in the United Kingdom

References

Internet in the United Kingdom